Viz may refer to:
viz., a synonym for “namely”
Viz (comics), a British adult comic magazine
Viz: The Game, a computer game based on the comic
Viz Media, an American manga and anime distribution and entertainment company 
"Viz", a song from the 2004 Le Tigre album This Island

See also

Hi viz (disambiguation)
Vis-à-vis (disambiguation)
VIZ-Stal, a Russian producer of cold-rolled electrical steels
WVIZ, an American TV station